Derek Hill may refer to:

 Derek Ingram Hill (19122003), English Anglican priest
 Derek Hill (painter) (19162000), English portrait and landscape painter
 Derek Hill (racing driver) (born 1975), American racing driver
 Derek R. Hill (active 1993 and after), American production designer
 Derek Hill (American football) (born 1967), American football player
 Derek Hill (baseball) (born 1995), American baseball player

See also 
 Hill (surname)